Charles William Prophet (born June 28, 1963) is an American singer-songwriter, guitarist and record producer. A Californian, Prophet first achieved notice in the American psychedelic/desert rock group Green on Red, with whom he toured and recorded in the 1980s. He has also recorded a number of solo records, and gained prominence as a musician and songwriter.

Life and work
Chuck Prophet was born in Whittier, California, United States, and calls San Francisco home.

After recording one E.P. and eight albums with rock group Green on Red, he released his first solo record Brother Aldo on Fire Records in 1990. It was not released in the U.S. until 1997.

He records and tours with his wife Stephanie Finch, who is a singer, keyboardist and guitarist.

Prophet was signed to New West Records by Peter Jesperson in 2002. He made two records for New West: No Other Love and Age of Miracles. After years of mostly European and UK success, 2002’s No Other Love was a breakthrough record for Prophet stateside due to the success of the summer single "Summertime Thing" and endorsements from Lucinda Williams, who gave him the opening slot for her summer tour.

Prophet was signed to Yep Roc Records in 2007.

Recorded in San Francisco and Nashville, 2007's Soap and Water received critical praise.  Prophet toured Europe and North America in support of the album and appeared with his band on the Late Show with David Letterman and Last Call with Carson Daly. To better motivate the various musicians and engineers who were involved in the production of this album, Prophet gave them a stake in the master recordings.

Prophet has contributed to several Kelly Willis records, and produced 2007's Translated From Love for Rykodisc. Willis and Prophet co-wrote six of the album's tracks and Prophet played guitar throughout.

Evangeline Recording Co. released a limited-edition work entitled Dreaming Waylon's Dreams, which he recorded in San Francisco.  The record re-creates Waylon Jennings' 1975 country album Dreaming My Dreams in its entirety and features, among others, members of American Music Club and Meat Beat Manifesto. The package and booklet were printed by the legendary Bruce Licher (Savage Republic, Independent Music Project, REM fan club etc.) using a custom letterpress design on original stock. Included in the packaging is a recounting of the events surrounding the recording of the record by close friend John Murry (who also played on the record). Each piece was printed and numbered by hand on a circa 1930's printing press. Dreaming Waylon's Dreams is one of the rarest and most sought-after items in Prophet's discography. It is a limited edition of only 1000. Released by Rounder Records, in 2001, Raisins in the Sun was a one-off collaboration with Jules Shear, Harvey Brooks, Paul Q. Kolderie, Jim Dickinson, Sean Slade, and Winston Watson, recorded in May 1999.

In 2008 Prophet co-wrote all the songs on Alejandro Escovedo's Real Animal, to which he also contributed guitar and vocals.  The LP was recorded in Lexington, Kentucky and produced by Tony Visconti.

In May 2009, Prophet along with a band of musicians including Ernest "Boom" Carter headed to Mexico City to record a collection of "political songs for non political people". ¡Let Freedom Ring! was released on October 27, 2009, on Yep Roc. Michael Hoinski of The Village Voice compared ¡Let Freedom Ring! to Bruce Springsteen's Born in the U.S.A., citing the recordings as "albums that manifest patriotism through disenchantment, and both rely heavily on marginalized characters to expose socioeconomic woes."

In January 2011, he formed the Spanish Bombs along with Chris Von Sneidern and San Francisco rhythm section The Park. The Spanish Bombs performed The Clash's LP London Calling in its entirety at the Actual Music Festival in Spain. This special project came at the invitation of curators Houston Party. This festival show was followed by a 12-date tour of Spain.

February 7, 2012, was the release date of the Temple Beautiful CD, a "nuanced, insightful and passionate ode to San Francisco" on Yep Roc Records. It was met with positive reviews scoring 82 on Metacritic. The title track, "Temple Beautiful" (featuring Roy Loney of the Flamin' Groovies), was proclaimed "Coolest Song in the World" on Little Stevens Underground Garage.

On March 3, 2013, Prophet played a Benefit Concert at The Great American Music Hall for Tom Mallon, a producer who documented much of the San Francisco Punk scene and went on to produce the early American Music Club records. (Mallon at that time had a brain tumor, which he died of in 2014.) Members of many seminal San Francisco bands played as well including members of American Music Club, Frightwig, Ugly Stick, Flying Color.

On September 23, 2014, Prophet released Night Surfer on Yep Roc Records. The album was met with positive reviews, including a three-and-a-half out of five star rating from All Music Guide.

On February 10, 2017, Prophet released Bobby Fuller Died For Your Sins. The album was given four out of five stars from All Music Guide.

On February 19, 2017, he appeared on the BBC Sunday morning political show The Andrew Marr Show singing "Bad Year For Rock and Roll," one of the standout tracks from his latest album Bobby Fuller Died For Your Sins.

In 2018, Prophet was tapped to co-write and produce a new LP for The Rubinoos. The album, From Home, released in 2019, was recorded at Hyde Street Studios in San Francisco, formerly Wally Heider Studios, where the group made some of its first recordings.

Songwriter
In 1996, Prophet was signed to Funzalo Music BMG Publishing and spent much of 1997 in Nashville as a staff writer. He has gone on to have his compositions and co-writes recorded by many artists including Alejandro Escovedo, Bruce Springsteen, Solomon Burke, Heart, Michael Grimm, Kim Carnes, Peter Wolf, Kim Richey, Carter's Chord, Jace Everett, Arc Angels, Penelope Houston, Latin Soul Syndicate, Micky & the Motorcars, Peter Mulvey, Bun E. Carlos, Mark Erelli, Mofro, Kevin Bowe, Calvin Russell, Ryan Hamilton, Chris Knight and Kelly Willis. He has toured with Memphis producer and pianist Jim Dickinson, who recorded Prophet's "Hungry Town". In Nashville, Tennessee, Prophet and songwriter Kim Richey penned "I'm Gone", a top-40 country hit in 2002 for singer Cyndi Thomson.

References in popular culture
 The song "No Other Love" was covered by the rock group Heart at the suggestion of Cameron Crowe. It was also featured in an episode of the television series The L Word, and in the film P.S. I Love You. In 2011, it was recorded by Michael Grimm, the winner of America's Got Talent, and included on his Don Was-produced debut CD.
 He appears as an actor playing "The Connection" in Revolution Summer, a film directed by Miles Matthew Montalbano and produced by Jonathan Richman.
 "You Did (Bomp Shooby Doobie Bomp)" was contributed as the theme song to the film Teeth. "You Did" was also featured in the closing credits of the HBO series True Blood episode "Keep This Party Going" (S02E02).
 The songs "Leave the Window Open" and "Love Won't Keep Us Apart," the latter co-written with klipschutz are featured in the FX program Sons of Anarchy.
 The song "Holding On" was featured in Californication

The Mission Express
The "Mission Express" is a bus line that runs through Prophet's neighborhood and is the name of his current band.

The line-up:
Stephanie Finch: (singing, Vox organ, piano, guitar)
Kevin White: (bass guitar)
Vicente Rodriguez: (drums, vocals)
James DePrato: (guitar, lap steel)

Former members:
Kyle Caprista: (drums, vocals) 2012–2013
Paul Taylor: (drums, vocals) -2012

Selected discography

Solo
 1990: Brother Aldo (Fire / Rough Trade)
 1992: Balinese Dancer (China / Homestead)
 1995: Feast of Hearts (China)
 1997: Homemade Blood (Cooking Vinyl)
 1999: The Hurting Business (Cooking Vinyl)
 2000: Homemade Boot (Live At Roskilde June 29, 1997) (Corduroy)
 2000: Turn the Pigeons Loose (Live In San Francisco 2000) (Cooking Vinyl) released 2004
 2002: No Other Love (New West / Blue Rose)
 2004: Age of Miracles (New West / Blue Rose)
 2007: Soap and Water (Cooking Vinyl / Yep Roc)
 2007  Dreaming Waylon's Dreams (Evangeline)
 2009: ¡Let Freedom Ring! (Cooking Vinyl / Yep Roc)
 2012: Temple Beautiful (Yep Roc)
 2014: Night Surfer (Yep Roc / Belle Sound)
 2017: Bobby Fuller Died for Your Sins (Yep Roc)
 2020: The Land That Time Forgot (Yep Roc)

With Green on Red
 1985: Gas Food Lodging (Enigma)
 1985: No Free Lunch (Mercury)
 1987: The Killer Inside Me (Mercury)
 1989: Here Come the Snakes (Restless)
 1989: Live at the Town & Country (China)
 1989: This Time Around (Off-Beat / China)
 1989–92: BBC Sessions (Cooking Vinyl) released 2007
 1991: Scapegoats (Off-Beat / China)
 1992: Too Much Fun (Off-Beat / China)
 2005: Live at the Rialto (Blue Rose)

With Jules Shear, Jim Dickinson, Harvey Brooks, Sean Slade, Paul Q. Kolderie, Winston Watson
 2001: Raisins in the Sun (Evangeline)

With Jim Dickinson and the Creatures of Habit
 1997: Thousand Footprints in the Sand (Last Call)

As guest musician
 1986: Eddie Ray Porter – When The Morning Falls (Less Records)
 1986: True West – Hand Of Fate (CD Presents)
 1991: Sonya Hunter – Favorite Short Stories (Heyday / Normal)
 1992: Paul Collins – Paul Collins (DRO)
 1996: Bob Neuwirth – Look Up (Watermelon)
 1997: Calvin Russell – Calvin Russell (Last Call)
 1998: Cake – Prolonging the Magic (Capricorn)
 1998: Penelope Houston – Tongue (WEA / Reprise)
 1998: The Silos – Heater (Checkered Past / Normal)
 1999: Kelly Willis – What I Deserve (Rykodisc)
 2000: Warren Zevon – Life'll Kill Ya (Artemis)
 2001: Penelope Houston – Loners, Stoners And Prison Brides (Return To Sender)
 2001: Jenifer McKitrick – Glow (Jenomatic)
 2002: Kelly Willis – Easy (Rykodisc)
 2002: Kim Richey – Rise (Lost Highway)
 2003: Duane Jarvis – Delicious (Slewfoot)
 2004: Cake – Pressure Chief (Columbia)
 2004: Kim Carnes – Chasin' Wild Trains (Spark Dawg)
 2005: Jeffrey Halford and the Healers – Railbirds (Shoeless)
 2012: Victor Krummenacher – I Was A Nightmare But I'm Not Going To Go There (Veritas Recordings)
 2022: Jenifer McKitrick – "Road Call" (Jenomatic Records)

References

Further reading
 Simkin, Stevie (2020). The Life and Music of Chuck Prophet and Green on Red. London: Jawbone Press. ISBN 978-1-911036-61-6

External links
NPR Artist Page
Official Site
 
 
Prophet Interviews Jonathan Richman
 Site francophone- French site
Chuck Prophet collection at the Internet Archive's live music archive

1963 births
Living people
Writers from Whittier, California
Musicians from Whittier, California
Mission District, San Francisco
American rock guitarists
American male guitarists
American male singers
American male songwriters
American rock singers
Singers from California
Songwriters from California
Guitarists from California
20th-century American guitarists
The Mission Express members
20th-century American male musicians
Yep Roc Records artists
Green on Red members